Memory Ngonda  (born 11 February 1998) is a Namibian women's international footballer who plays as a midfielder. She is a member of the Namibia women's national football team. She was part of the team at the 2014 African Women's Championship. On club level she played for SOS Children's Village FC in Namibia.

References

1998 births
Living people
Namibian women's footballers
Namibia women's international footballers
Place of birth missing (living people)
Women's association football midfielders